Antoni Prochaska (Mai 24, 1852 – September 23, 1930) was a Polish historian.
He was born in a village of Zalishchyky (now Chortkiv Raion, Ternopil Oblast) the oldest son of Andrzej, a ranger, and Angieszka.

He worked as an archivist in the Archiwum Akt Grodzkich i Ziemskich we Lwowie from 1878 to 1929. Antoni Prochaska was member of the Academy of Learning since 1893.

In 1929 he was awarded by the Officer's Cross of the Order of Polonia Restituta.

Publications 
Wyprawa na Smoleńsk: (z listów litewskiego kanclerza r. 1609-1611), 1911
Sejmik wiszeński 1503 r., 1922
Hołdy mazowieckie 1386-1430

References

Sources

External links 
Gmerek Sławomir: Antoni Prochaska i jego wkład w rozwój historiografii polskiej

1852 births
1930 deaths
People from Ternopil Oblast
People from the Kingdom of Galicia and Lodomeria
20th-century Polish historians
Polish male non-fiction writers
Historians of Poland
Recipients of the Order of Polonia Restituta
19th-century Polish historians